Desmond "Dessie" Grew (14 September 1953 – 9 October 1990) was a volunteer in the East Tyrone Brigade of the Provisional Irish Republican Army (IRA). Grew was killed by undercover Special Air Service soldiers in County Armagh in 1990 along with fellow IRA volunteer, Martin McCaughey who was also a Sinn Féin councillor.

Background
Grew was the second eldest in a family of seven girls and four boys born to Kathleen and Patrick Grew. He was educated at primary level at Knockaconey Primary School and at secondary level at his local Christian Brothers School (CBS), where he obtained the highest grades at both "O" and "A" levels. Grew was deeply interested in Irish culture: he spoke the Irish language fluently and represented both his school and local parish Gaelic football teams.

The Grews originally lived in a predominantly Ulster loyalist area and their family home was attacked on a number of occasions. It was eventually burnt down in 1972. The Grew family then moved to the outskirts of Charlemont, County Armagh, a village southeast of Moy, where again the home was burnt down as a result of a bomb attack in which six of the Grew children were injured.

Paramilitary career
During his adult life Dessie Grew was a highly active member of the Irish National Liberation Army and the IRA. An arrest warrant for Grew had been issued by German police on suspicion of the murder of RAF communications operative Corporal Maheshkumar 'Mick' Islania and his six month old daughter, Nivruti Islania, in West Germany in 1989.

Grew was shot dead along with Martin McCaughey in an operation by undercover British soldiers. The British Army's 14 Intelligence Company, which was a secret undercover intelligence unit, also known as the DET, were monitoring three AK47s at a farm building in this rural part of County Armagh and were aware that Grew and McCaughey were due to remove the guns.

As the pair approached an agricultural shed which was being used to grow mushrooms and also thought to have been an IRA arms dump, as many as 200 shots are believed to have been fired at them. Autopsy results showed Grew had 48 bullet wounds and McCaughey 12. British Army reports of the shooting stated that the two men left the shed holding two rifles. Republican sources state the men were unarmed.

His brother Seamus Grew had also been killed in disputed circumstances by an undercover E4A squad on the outskirts of Armagh in 1982. Grew had stated weeks before his death that in the event of his death that he wished to be laid beside Seamus. In line with his wishes, Grew was buried at Armagh City cemetery in October 1990. Gerry Adams gave the oration at his funeral, calling him "a freedom fighter, a patriot and a decent upstanding Irish citizen".

Aftermath
The family of McCaughey claimed that Grew and McCaughey were ambushed after a stake out by the SAS. In January 2002, Justice Weatherup, a Northern Ireland High Court Judge ordered that official military document relating to the shooting should be disclosed. However, PSNI Chief Constable Hugh Orde had the ruling overturned on appeal in January 2005.

In April and May 2012, an inquest in front of a jury was held. Reaching its verdict after hearing weeks of evidence, the jury ruled that the SAS had used "reasonable force" during the operation and that the IRA men's own actions had contributed to their deaths.

See also
The Troubles in Loughgall
Provisional IRA East Tyrone Brigade

References

General

1953 births
1990 deaths
Deaths by firearm in Northern Ireland
Irish National Liberation Army members
Irish republicans
Irish language activists
People from County Armagh
People killed by security forces during The Troubles (Northern Ireland)
People killed in United Kingdom intelligence operations
Provisional Irish Republican Army members
Republicans imprisoned during the Northern Ireland conflict